Kodeesvarar Temple is a Hindu temple dedicated to the deity Shiva, located at Kothangudi in Nagapattinam district in Tamil Nadu, India.

Vaippu Sthalam
It is one of the shrines of the Vaippu Sthalams sung by Tamil Saivite Nayanar Sambandar.

Presiding deity
The presiding deity is represented by the lingam known as Kodeesvarar. The Goddess is known as Prannayaki.

Specialities
As Shiva is known as Kuthan, who come atop nandhi, this place is also called as Kutthangudi. Earlier this place consisted of many trees. After seeing a Linga, a king set up a temple in this place. Kuthu means stands straight. There is a story stating that as straight this Linga came from Nāga world.

Structure
The temple does not have Gopuram. It has one entrance. In the facade of the entrance suthai sculptures of Shiva and Parvati are found sitting in Kailash. They are flanked by Vinayaka and Subramania. On either Narada and Nandhi are found. The temple has one Prakaram with the shrines of Vinayaka and Subramania. In the front mandapa, in the right side, facing south shrine of Goddess is found. In the garbhagriha the presiding deity is found. In the kosta Dakshinamurthy, Lingodbhava, Durga and Chandikesvarar are found. A shrine with two Vinayakas and Navagraha shrine are also found.

Location
It is located at a distance of 2 km from Mandhai Pillayar Temple Kumbakonam-Karaikkal road. This place also can be reached from Mayiladuthurai to Komal, at a distance of 3 km. This temple is opened for worship from 8.00 a.m. to 11.00 a.m. and 5.30 p.m. to 6.30 p.m. Festivals such as Thiruvathira and Panguni Uthiram are held in this temple.

References

Hindu temples in Nagapattinam district
Shiva temples in Nagapattinam district